Aldo Guna, also known as Erald Guna, (born 18 January 1985) is an Albanian footballer from Vlorë.

References

1985 births
Living people
Footballers from Vlorë
Albanian footballers
Association football midfielders
Flamurtari Vlorë players
KF Skënderbeu Korçë players
KF Teuta Durrës players
KF Vlora players
KF Himara players